Favartia paulmieri is a species of sea snail, a marine gastropod mollusk in the family Muricidae, the murex snails or rock snails.

Description

Distribution
This marine species occurs in the Caribbean Sea off Martinique.

References

 Houart, R., 2002. Description of a new muricopsine species (Gastropoda: Muricidae) from Martinique, Lesser Antilles. Novapex 3(4): 139-140
 Garrigues B. & Lamy D. (2019). Inventaire des Muricidae récoltés au cours de la campagne MADIBENTHOS du MNHN en Martinique (Antilles Françaises) et description de 12 nouvelles espèces des genres Dermomurex, Attilosa, Acanthotrophon, Favartia, Muricopsis et Pygmaepterys (Mollusca, Gastropoda). Xenophora Taxonomy. 23: 22-59

Muricidae
Gastropods described in 2002